Zoltán Beke (30 July 1911 – 9 March 1994) was a Romanian football player and coach of Hungarian ethnicity who played as a striker. He was a member of the Romania national football team which competed at the 1934 FIFA World Cup, but he did not play any match.

Player career

Club career

International career

Managerial career

Honours

Player
Ripensia Timișoara
Liga I (4): 1932–33, 1934–35, 1935–36, 1937–38
Cupa României (2): 1933–34, 1935–36
CFR Turnu Severin
Cupa României (1): 1942–43
Kolozsvári VSC
Hungarian Cup Runner-up (1):1943–44

Coach
CFR Turnu Severin
Cupa României (1): 1942–43

References

External links

1911 births
1994 deaths
Romanian footballers
Association football forwards
Romania international footballers
1934 FIFA World Cup players
Hungarians in Vojvodina
Romanian sportspeople of Hungarian descent
Liga I players
Chinezul Timișoara players
FC Ripensia Timișoara players
CFR Turnu Severin players